The Best of David Bowie 1974/1979 is a compilation album by English singer-songwriter David Bowie, released in 1998 by EMI. It follows The Best of David Bowie 1969/1974 (1997) and includes material released between 1974 and 1979. This album was also included as the second disc of the compilation The Platinum Collection (2005/2006).

Track listing
All songs written by David Bowie, except where noted.

Charts

Certifications

References

David Bowie compilation albums
1998 greatest hits albums
EMI Records compilation albums